Trochiliscaceae is a family of fossil charophyte green algae. It is the only member of the order Trochiliscales. The reproductive structures in Trochiliscaceae (and families placed in Sycidiales by AlgaeBase) have a calcified cover, called a utricle, that is thought to prevent the zygote being desiccated. Other Paleozoic families lack this cover, as do modern charophytes. Fossils of Trochiliscaceae are from the Devonian.

Genera
, AlgaeBase accepted the following genera.
†Karpinskya (Croft) Grambast – 2 species
†Moellerina E.O.Ulrich – 3 species
†Primochara T.A.Istchenko & Saidakovsky – 2 species
†Trochiliscus Karpinsky – 7 species

References

Charophyta
Green algae families